The discography American hip hop recording artist YFN Lucci consists of one studio album, seven mixtapes, six extended plays and twenty singles (including eleven as a featured artist).

Albums

Studio albums

EPs

Mixtapes

Singles

As lead artist

As featured artist

Other charted or certified songs

Guest appearances

Notes

References

External links
 

Discographies of American artists
Hip hop discographies